SS Daphne was a ship which sank moments after her launching at the shipyard of Alexander Stephen and Sons in Govan, Glasgow, Scotland, on 3 July 1883.

Background 
Around 200 workmen were on board the ship at the time it was launched, ready to begin fitting out work as soon as she was properly afloat. According to the usual practice during a launching, anchors were attached by cable to each side of the ship. As the Daphne moved into the river, the anchors failed to stop the ship's forward progress. The starboard anchor moved only 6 to 7 yards (5.5 to 6.4 meters), but the port anchor was dragged 60 yards (55 meters). The current of the river caught Daphne and flipped her over onto her port side, sinking her in deep water.

124 people died including many young boys. 70 lives were saved. It took more than a fortnight for the bodies of those who died to be recovered.

Inquiry 
An inquiry was held afterward; the shipyard owners were held blameless, which led to claims of a cover-up. The cause of the disaster was reported to be little initial stability combined with too much loose gear and too many people on board. 

One of the outcomes of the disaster was the limiting of personnel aboard to only those necessary for mooring the ship after the launch.

The Daphne was later raised, repaired, and renamed the Rose.

Memorials
The principal memorial to the Daphne is in Craigton Cemetery where around 50 of the victims are buried. It was designed by William Robin and erected in 1885. The monument faces east onto the eastern path and is one of the larger monuments in this section.

Two further and later memorials, to what was known at the time as the "Linthouse Disaster", exist; one erected in Victoria Park, Whiteinch in 1996 and another in Elder Park, Govan.

See also
 List of United Kingdom disasters by death toll

References

External links
 Daphne-inspired poem

Shipwrecks of Scotland
History of Glasgow
Shipwrecks in rivers
Maritime incidents in July 1883
1883 ships
Ships built on the River Clyde